The Estuary of Bilbao (Spanish: Ría de Bilbao / Basque: Bilboko Itsasadarra) lies at the common mouth of the rivers Nervion, Ibaizabal and Cadagua, which drain most of Biscay and part of Alava in the Basque Country, Spain. In this instance, the Spanish word estuario is used to describe what in English would normally be called part estuary, part tidal river. The estuary becomes a tidal river which extends  into the city of Bilbao, starting from the Bilbao Abra bay. It hosts the port of Bilbao throughout its length, although the Port Authority has recently restored most of the upper reaches to Bilbao and other municipalities for their urban regeneration. The port is now being transferred to the seaboard on the coast at Santurtzi and Zierbena.

Downstream from Bilbao the river divides its metropolitan area in its left bank  (Barakaldo, Sestao, Portugalete and Santurtzi) and right bank (Erandio, Leioa and Getxo).

The recovery of the estuary
The estuary and tidal river of Bilbao have always been a significant part of the city. Bilbao was born 700 years ago on the banks of the Nervión river as a trading village. It gradually expanded downstream until arriving at the sea. Unfortunately, the river reached high levels of contamination because of the industrial activities during the past century. In recent years, work has been undertaken to restore the condition of the estuary.

References

External links

Bilbao Ria 2000

 
Geography of Bilbao
Estuaries of Spain
Landforms of the Basque Country (autonomous community)